Noceto  is a comune (municipality) in the province of Parma in the Italian region Emilia-Romagna, located about  northwest of Bologna and about  west of Parma. 

The municipality of Noceto contains the frazioni (subdivisions, mainly villages and hamlets) Borghetto, Cella, Costamezzana, Ponte Taro and Sanguinaro.

Noceto borders the following municipalities: Collecchio, Fidenza, Fontanellato, Fontevivo, Medesano, Parma.

Twin towns
 Walnut Creek, USA, since 1987
 Noyers-sur-Serein, France, since 1990
 Cricova, Moldova, since 2000

References

External links
 Official website

Cities and towns in Emilia-Romagna